Visconti Castle (in Italian Castello Visconteo) may refer to a number of castles including:

Visconti Castle (Abbiategrasso)
Visconti Castle (Bereguardo)
Visconti Castle (Binasco)
Visconti Castle (Castelletto sopra Ticino)
Visconti Castle (Cusago)
Visconti Castle (Crenna)
Visconti Castle (Invorio)
Visconti Castle (Lodi)
Visconti Castle (Locarno)
Visconti Castle (Massino)
Visconti Castle (Pagazzano)
Visconti Castle (Pandino)
Visconti Castle (Pavia)
Visconti Castle (Somma Lombardo)
Visconti Castle (Vercelli)
Visconti-Castelbarco Castle
Visconti-Sforza Castle (Novara)
Visconti-Sforza Castle (Vigevano)

See also
List of castles in Italy
Visconti (disambiguation)